29th Street station may refer to:

 29th station, a former L station in Chicago, Illinois
 29th Street station (Sacramento), a light rail station in Sacramento, California
 Church and 29th Street / Church and Day stations, a streetcar stop in San Francisco, California
 29th Avenue station, a rapid transit station in Vancouver, British Columbia

See also 
 29th Street (disambiguation)